The current United States Ambassador to the Holy See is Joe Donnelly, who replaced the ad interim Chargé d'Affaires, Patrick Connell, on April 11, 2021. The Holy See is represented by its apostolic nuncio, Archbishop Christophe Pierre, who assumed office on April 12, 2016. The U.S. Embassy to the Holy See is located in Rome, in the Villa Domiziana. The Nunciature to the United States is located in Washington, D.C., at 3339 Massachusetts Avenue, N.W.

History

1797–1867
The United States maintained consular relations with the Papal States from 1797 under President George Washington and Pope Pius VI to 1867 and President Andrew Johnson and Pope Pius IX. Diplomatic relations existed with the Pope, in his capacity as head of state of the Papal States, from 1848 under President James K. Polk to 1867 under President Andrew Johnson, though not at the ambassadorial level. These relations lapsed when on February 28, 1867, Congress passed legislation that prohibited any future funding of United States diplomatic missions to the Holy See. This decision was based on mounting anti-Catholic sentiment in the United States, fueled by the conviction and hanging of Mary Surratt, and three other Catholics, for taking part in the conspiracy to assassinate President Abraham Lincoln.  Her son, John Surratt, also Catholic, was accused of plotting with John Wilkes Booth in the Assassination of Abraham Lincoln. He served briefly as a Pontifical Zouave but was recognized and arrested. He escaped to Egypt but was eventually arrested and extradited. There was also an  allegation that the Pope had forbidden the celebration of Protestant religious services, which had been held weekly in the home of the American Minister in Rome, within the walls of the city.

1867–1984
From 1867 to 1984, the United States did not have diplomatic relations with the Holy See in the wake of rumors of Catholic implication in the Lincoln assassination. The critics finally won out in 1867 when the US Congress withdrew all funding for the legation in Rome. The apparent reason was a rumor relating to the religious freedom of Protestants in the Papal States. From the beginning of the legation in Rome, Papal authorities had allowed the celebration of Protestant religious services in the home of the American Minister. When the services grew, they were moved to a rented apartment under the seal of the American Legation to accommodate the participants. The news floating around Washington and being reported in the New York Times was that the Pope had forced the Protestant group outside the walls of Rome. That, according to Rufus King, the American Minister himself, was untrue in its entirety. In his June 1908 apostolic constitution, Sapienti Consilio, Pope Pius X decreed that as of November 3 that year, the Catholic Church in the United States would no longer be supervised by the Vatican's missionary agency, the Congregation for the Propagation of the Faith (Propaganda Fide) and would now be a mission-sending Church, not “mission territory.”

Several presidents designated personal envoys to visit the Holy See periodically for discussions of international humanitarian and political issues. The first was Postmaster General James Farley, the first high-ranking government official to normalize relations with the Holy See. In 1933, Farley set sail for Europe, along with Soviet Commissar of Foreign Affairs Maxim Litvinov, on the Italian liner . In Italy, Farley had an audience with Pope Pius XI and dinner with Cardinal Pacelli, who was to succeed to the papacy in 1939. Myron Charles Taylor served Presidents Franklin D. Roosevelt and Harry S. Truman from 1939 to 1950.

Presidents Nixon, Ford, Carter, and Reagan also appointed personal envoys to the Pope.  Also, all of those presidents, in addition to Truman, Eisenhower, Kennedy, Johnson, and all later presidents, along with the first ladies, in diplomatic dress code black and mantillas, have visited the Vatican, during the course of their administrations.

On October 20, 1951, President Truman nominated former General Mark W. Clark to be the United States emissary to the Holy See. Clark later withdrew his nomination on January 13, 1952, following protests from Senator Tom Connally (D-TX) and Protestant groups. The official prohibition lasted until September 22, 1983, when it was repealed by the "Lugar Act".

The Vatican has historically been accused of being un-American, at least until the presidency of John F. Kennedy (see Americanism (heresy), nativism and anti-Catholicism in the United States). The bulk of the accusation is found in Paul Blanshard's book American Freedom and Catholic Power, which attacked the Holy See on grounds that it was a dangerous, powerful, foreign and undemocratic institution.

1984–present

The United States and the Holy See announced the establishment of diplomatic relations on January 10, 1984.  In sharp contrast to the long record of strong domestic opposition, this time there was very little opposition from Congress, the courts, and Protestant groups.  On March 7, 1984, the Senate confirmed William A. Wilson as the first U.S. ambassador to the Holy See. Ambassador Wilson had been President Reagan's personal envoy to the Pope since 1981. The Holy See named Archbishop Pio Laghi as the first Apostolic Nuncio (equivalent to ambassador) of the Holy See to the U.S. Archbishop Laghi had been Pope John Paul II's apostolic delegate to the Catholic Church in the United States since 1980.  Relations between President Ronald Reagan and Pope John Paul II were close especially because of their shared anti-communism and keen interest in forcing the Soviets out of Poland.
Also, the two men forged a common bond over having survived assassination attempts just six weeks apart in the spring of 1981.

Following the September 11 attacks and the beginning of the US war on terrorism from 2001, the Vatican has been critical of the war on terrorism in general, and particularly critical of the US policies in Iraq. On July 10, 2009, then-president Barack Obama and Pope Benedict XVI met in Rome. A planned relocation of the U.S. embassy to the Holy See to the same location as the U.S. embassy to Italy drew criticism from several former U.S. ambassadors. On March 27, 2014, Obama and Pope Francis met in Rome; this was followed by Pope Francis's 2015 visit to North America in September 2015, where, after visiting Cuba, he came to the U.S., and participated in the World Meeting of Families in Philadelphia, and also visited Washington, D.C., and New York City.

In June 2015, the United States and the Holy See concluded their first inter-governmental agreement which aims at curtailing offshore tax evasion through automatic exchange of tax information.

In May 2017, then-president Donald Trump met with Pope Francis in the Vatican. The two exchanged gifts, and following a closed door meeting, Trump said "Thank you. Thank you. I won't forget what you said[.]"

In October 2021, President Joe Biden met with Pope Francis in the Vatican. Biden later claimed that Pope Francis said in a private meeting that he was a good Catholic and should continue to receive Communion.

See also
 Foreign policy of the United States
 Multilateral foreign policy of the Holy See
 Catholic Church and politics in the United States

References

External links
 History of Holy See - U.S. relations
 The Pope and the Presidents: the Italian Unification and the American Civil War, 2015 Ph.D. dissertation

 
United States
Bilateral relations of the United States